Bombom is a town in the north-eastern part of São Tomé Island in São Tomé and Príncipe. Its population is 498 (2012 census). It lies 2 km west of Pantufo and 3 km south of the city centre of the capital São Tomé. It is the birthplace of the President Evaristo Carvalho.

Population history

Sporting club
Inter Bom-Bom, a football (soccer) club that currently plays in the regional Premier Division.

References

Populated places in Mé-Zóchi District